Angam is a 1983 Indian Malayalam film, directed by Joshiy. The film stars Prem Nazir, Madhu, Seema and Jagathy Sreekumar in the lead roles. The film has musical score by Shankar–Ganesh. It was a remake of the Tamil film Gnana Oli, which was remade in Hindi as Devata.

Cast

Prem Nazir as Antony / William D'Cruz
Madhu as Inspector Lawrence
Seema as Marykkutti
Jagathy Sreekumar as Ponnan
Jose Prakash as Chacko
Rajalakshmi as Tressa
Shankar as Johnny
Prathapachandran as Dr. Rehman
Balan K. Nair as Father John
Janardanan
Kunchan as Chinnan
P. R. Varalekshmi as Dr. Rehman's wife
Raveendran as Rajan (Dubbing Chandramohan)
Srividya as Thresya
 P. R. Menon... as Maash

Soundtrack
The music was composed by Shankar–Ganesh and the lyrics were written by Pappanamkodu Lakshmanan.

References

External links
 

1983 films
1980s Malayalam-language films
Films scored by Shankar–Ganesh
Films directed by Joshiy